The Americas Zone is one of the three zones of regional Davis Cup competition in 2009.

In the Americas Zone there are four different groups in which teams compete against each other to advance to the next group.

Participating teams

Draw

 and  relegated to Group III in 2010.
 promoted to Group I in 2010.

First round matches

Mexico vs. Jamaica

Venezuela vs. Netherlands Antilles

Guatemala vs. Dominican Republic

Bahamas vs. Paraguay

Second round matches

Venezuela vs. Mexico

Dominican Republic vs. Paraguay

First round play-off matches

Jamaica vs. Netherlands Antilles

Guatemala vs. Bahamas

Third round matches

Dominican Republic vs. Venezuela

External links
Davis Cup draw details

Group II